The 1960 Arizona Wildcats football team represented the University of Arizona in the Border Conference during the 1960 NCAA University Division football season.  In their second season under head coach Jim LaRue, the Wildcats compiled a 7–3 record and outscored their opponents, 233 to 152. The team captain was Tony Matz.  The team played its home games in Arizona Stadium in Tucson, Arizona.

The team's statistical leaders included Eddie Wilson with 1,020 passing yards, Bobby Thompson with 732 rushing yards, and Joe Hernandez with 442 receiving yards.

Schedule

References

Arizona
Arizona Wildcats football seasons
Arizona Wildcats football